The Wolseley Eight is a four door, light saloon car which was produced by Wolseley Motors from 1946 until 1948. It was based on the Morris Eight Series E and also shared many body panels with the MG Y-type. At the time it was said to be Lord Nuffield's favourite car. The car was designed before World War II and was originally intended to have been launched in 1940. In line with the prevailing economic directives from the United Kingdom government, the majority of cars were exported.

Although based on the 1938 Morris Eight, the car was given a very different external appearance by having a traditional Wolseley bonnet and grille and the boot lid was bottom rather than top hinged. The suspension was non-independent and used half elliptic leaf springs front and rear and the brakes were drums all round, hydraulically actuated. The electrical system was 6 volt.

The car had an up-market interior with leather upholstery, pile carpets and walnut trim. Another traditional feature was an opening windscreen. All models had four doors, the two-door version of the Morris body was not offered as a Wolseley. At launch the car was priced at £416, £115 more than the Morris.

References

External links
Wolseley Eight information

Eight
Cars introduced in 1946